Saint-Antoine may refer to the following places:

Canada
Saint-Antoine, New Brunswick, a village
Saint-Antoine-de-l'Isle-aux-Grues, Quebec, a parish in Chaudière-Appalaches
Saint-Antoine-de-Tilly, Quebec, a municipality in Chaudière-Appalaches
Saint-Antoine-sur-Richelieu, Quebec, a municipality in Montérégie

France
Saint-Antoine, Cantal, a commune in the department of Cantal
Saint-Antoine, Doubs, a commune in the department of Doubs
Saint-Antoine, Gers, a commune in the department of Gers
Saint-Antoine, Gironde, a former commune in the department of Gironde
Saint-Antoine hospital, at Pierre and Marie Curie University
Faubourg Saint-Antoine, one of the traditional suburbs of Paris, now part of the  11th and  12th  arrondissements.

Switzerland
Saint-Antoine, the French name for St. Antoni, in the canton of Fribourg